In music, Op. 173 stands for Opus number 173. Compositions that are assigned this number include:

 Czerny – Piano Trio No. 3 (Troisième Grand Trio)
 Strauss – Dynamiden
 Wolff – Kleine Erzählungen